Tyler Vecchio (born 15 January 2003), is an Australian professional footballer who plays as a midfielder for Perth Glory. He made his professional debut in a FFA Cup playoff match against Melbourne Victory on 24 November 2021.

References

External links

Living people
Australian soccer players
Association football midfielders
Perth Glory FC players
National Premier Leagues players
2003 births